Wilde Lake High School is a secondary school located in Columbia, Maryland's Village of Wilde Lake, United States, one of 12 public high schools in Howard County.

The school is centrally located in Howard County, and its district borders that of River Hill High School, Marriotts Ridge High School, Centennial High School, Howard High School, Oakland Mills High School, and Atholton High School.

History
Bids were requested by January 1970 for a 1,350-seat school to be built for an estimated $2.6 million. Opened in 1971 as a model school for the nation, it was Columbia's first high school. It had an open doughnut-shaped design with "open classrooms," and was a model school for new teaching settings.

In 1994, the original 910-student building, which did not meet current safety standards, was demolished. A new $20 million 1,200-seat building with a more traditional style was reconstructed on the same site by Cochran, Stephenson and Donkevoet. The new building, opened in 1996, replicates the open idea, with a central main street, and halls surrounding it and a bridge across the second floor.

Students

The racial makeup of the population during the 2017–2018 school year was 26.7% White, 43.8% Black or African American, 7.2% Asian, 14.6% Hispanic or Latino, 0% Native American, 0.4% Native Hawaiian or Pacific Islander, and 7.4% two or more races.

Jim Rouse Theatre
Wilde Lake has a modern 750-seat theater named for Columbia founder James Rouse, who went by "Jim". The theatre has its own separate entrance and is used by both school and community groups. The 12,500-square-foot performance space is also used for community meetings, sales rallies, exhibitions, and business training sessions. The theatre has a total of 739 seats and eight handicapped accessible locations.

Athletics
Wilde Lake High School has a number of sports teams for each season of the academic year, including football, soccer, golf, volleyball, basketball, and cross country. The school has won the following state championships:

Cross country
1971 – Boys' cross country
1996 – Girls' cross country
1996 – Boys' cross country
2005 – Boys' cross country
2006 – Boys' cross country
2007 – Boys' cross country

Football
1985 – Football
1990 - Football
1991 – Football
1992 – Football
1997 – Football
2010 – Football

Soccer
1976 – Boys' soccer
1981 – Boys' soccer
1982 – Boys' soccer
1983 – Boys' soccer
1984 – Boys' soccer
1991 – Boys' soccer
1997 – Boys' soccer
2019 – Boys' soccer

Basketball
1985 – Boys' basketball
1994 - Boys' basketball State Finalist
1995 – Girls' basketball

Ice hockey
2008 – State Finalist
Wilde lake no longer fields an independent ice hockey team. From 20112018, a co-op team with players from Oakland Mills and Hammond High Schools was formed, known as the “WHO”. In 2018, Centennial and Long Reach High Schools joined the WHO to form the Wolves.

Tennis
1985 – Boys' tennis doubles
1986 – Mixed doubles
2001 – Mixed doubles
2006 – Boys' tennis singles

Track and field
1975 – Boys' track and field

In 2015, Carol Satterwhite, a physical education teacher at the Wilde Lake High School was selected for the National Interscholastic Athletic Administrators Association Hall of Fame.

Band program
The school has a band program consisting of groups including the marching band and wind ensemble.

The Paw Print
The Paw Print is an independent publication of Wilde Lake High School.

Accommodations
Wilde Lake has a special education program. In addition to its programs for the disabled, Wilde Lake accommodates teen mothers through their in school daycare center.

Notable alumni
Zach Brown (class of 2007) – American football player, free agent
David Bentley Hart (class of 1982) – writer, theologian, and cultural critic
Isaiah Coulter - attended freshman through junior year
Dr. Terri L. Hill (class of 1977) - Maryland State Delegate, District 12 
Robert Kolker (class of 1987) – author and journalist
Mark D. Levine (class of 1987) – Manhattan borough president
Sara Lindsey (class of 2007) – actress
Laura Lippman (class of 1977) – author and award-winning journalist
Edward Norton (class of 1987) – actor
Maria L. Oesterreicher (Class of 1986) - Judge - first female Circuit Court Judge in the history of Carroll County Maryland
John Overdeck (class of 1986) – hedge fund manager and philanthropist
Elise Ray (Class of 2000) - Olympic Gymnast
Lo-Fang (class of 2002) – musician
Jim Traber (class of 1979) - Major League Baseball Player for the Baltimore Orioles
Curtis Yarvin (class of 1988) – computer scientist, political philosopher, neoreactionary thinker

See also
Howard County Public Schools

References

External links
 

Educational institutions established in 1971
Public high schools in Maryland
Public schools in Howard County, Maryland
Columbia, Maryland
1971 establishments in Maryland